Baye is both a surname and a given name. Notable people with the name include:

Michael Baye (born 1961), American academic
Nathalie Baye (born 1948), four-time César award-winning French actress
Baye Djiby Fall (born 1985), Senegalese football striker

See also
Paulette del Baye (1877–1945), French actress, singer and dancer from Cuba